Abou-Deïa or Aboudeïa is a town in the Salamat Region of southern-central Chad.

Geographical location 
The city is located in southeastern Chad, north of the wadi Korom, west of Wadi Avis, 508 meters above sea level.
Abou Deia is located about 456 kilometers east-southeast from the capital N'Djamena.

Climate 
The climate of the city is described as Semiarid climate (BSh in the Köppen climate classification). The average annual temperature is 27.9 °C. The average temperature of the coldest month (January) is 25.3 °C, and that of the warmest (April) is 31.9 °C. The estimated year-round precipitation is 772 mm. The amount of precipitation is unevenly distributed throughout the year, with the most precipitation occurring from May to October. The greatest amount of precipitation falls in August (250 mm).

Transportation 
There is an airport on the outskirts of the city.

Transport
The town is served by Abou-Deïa Airport.

References

Populated places in Chad
Salamat Region